Ingebrigt Vik (5 March 1867 – 22 March 1927) was a Norwegian sculptor. Vik is regarded as having been one of Norway's greatest sculptors from the first part of the 20th century.

Biography
Ingebrigt Vik was born in the village of Øystese  in the municipality of Kvam,  Hordaland county, Norway. He was the son of Hans Gunnarson Tveit (1832–1901) and Ingebjørg Torgeirsdotter Vik (1841–1902).  He grew up in Øystese and began as a wood carver in his father's factory.  He  trained as an artist at the Royal Danish Academy of Fine Arts in Copenhagen from 1889 to 1891.  After surgery for tuberculosis in his left knee, he returned home to recover. In 1903 he moved to Paris and  attended Académie Colarossi where he trained with sculptor Jean Antoine Injalbert. In 1906, he was  assigned the  Houens legat and studied in Italy.

Some of Vik's best known works are in the National Gallery of Norway, including Ung Pike (1903) Sittende ung pike (1908) and Ynglingen (1913). In the theatre gardens in Bergen there is his statue of the composer Edvard Grieg (1915) in bronze. His statue of Norwegian mathematician Niels Henrik Abel  was first shown publicly at the Autumn Exhibition in Oslo in 1904. It stands today in front of Niels Henrik Abels hus at the University of Oslo. Many of his works  stand in the Ingebrigt Vik Museum.

Ingebrigt Vik Museum
Ingebrigt Vik Museum is an art museum in the village of Øystese.  When Ingebrigt Vik died in 1927, he bequeathed his artistic production, totaling over one hundred sculptures, to his home district. The collection consists of work in terracotta, plaster, marble and bronze. The building was designed by the architect Torgeir Alvsaker (1875-1971) and was inaugurated in 1934. The museum is operated in conjunction with  Hardanger og Voss Museum, an organization of  museums in Hordaland County, Norway.

References

Related reading
Billedhuggeren Ingebrigt Vik: Utg. av Ingebrigt Vik museum (Bergen: John Grieg Forlag, 1967)

External links
Hardanger and Voss museum website

1867 births
1927 deaths
People from Kvam 
Royal Danish Academy of Fine Arts alumni
Académie Colarossi alumni
Norwegian sculptors
Norwegian women sculptors
20th-century sculptors
19th-century sculptors